Fokion (Phokion) Zaimis (1899–1967) was a Greek politician. He served twice as minister of the interior (1949–1950, 1965–1966), minister of finance (March–April 1950, August–September 1950), minister of economy (March 1950, August–September 1950, 1951), minister of housing and reconstruction (1950–1951), minister of health (1950), minister of welfare (1950–1952) and minister of commerce (1947–1948).

References
Rulers.org

1899 births
1967 deaths
Ministers of the Interior of Greece